Mitch Beardmore is an English professional footballer who plays as a midfielder for  club Exeter City.

Career
Beardmore was with Yeovil Town until their Academy closed in 2020. He made his senior debut for Exeter City on 18 October 2022, in a 4–1 defeat at Forest Green Rovers in the group stages of the EFL Trophy.

Career statistics

References

Living people
English footballers
Association football midfielders
Yeovil Town F.C. players
Exeter City F.C. players
Year of birth missing (living people)